Barbonymus platysoma is a species of cyprinid fish endemic to Indonesia.  This species can reach a length of  TL.

References

platysoma
Freshwater fish of Indonesia
Fish described in 1855